SEG or seg may refer to:

Organisations
 Society of Economic Geologists
 Society of Exploration Geophysicists
 Semaphore Entertainment Group, co-founder of the Ultimate Fighting Championship
 Southern Examining Group, a former English examining body
 Special Escort Group (Metropolitan Police), England
 Special Escort Group (Ministry of Defence Police) (SEG (MDP)), UK

Other uses
 Smart Export Guarantee, a scheme which rewards export of electricity by small-scale low-carbon generators in the United Kingdom
 Supplementum Epigraphicum Graecum, new studies of ancient Greek inscriptions
 Penn Valley Airport IATA code
 Ség., taxonomic author abbreviation of Jean-François Séguier (1703–1784), French botanist

See also
 Segment (disambiguation)